The city of Ottawa, Canada held municipal elections on November 13, 1978.

Controller Marion Dewar becomes the second woman and first New Democratic Party (and to date, only) affiliated person to become mayor of Ottawa. She defeated former alderman Pat Nicol. This would mark the last elections for Ottawa's Board of Control.

Mayor

Ottawa Board of Control
(4 elected)

Ottawa City Council

Ottawa Board of Education Trustees
Six to be elected in each zone
 

 

4 to be elected 

1 to be elected

References
Ottawa Citizen, November 14, 1978

Municipal elections in Ottawa
1978 elections in Canada
1970s in Ottawa
1978 in Ontario